Aethes dilucidana, the short-barred yellow conch, is a species of moth of the family Tortricidae. It was described by Stephens in 1852. It is found in most of Europe, Algeria, southern Siberia, Kazakhstan, Turkmenistan, Kyrgyzstan and Iran.

Adults are on wing from June to July.

The larvae feed on Peucedanum sativum, Pastinaca sativa and Heracleum sphondylium. Larvae can be found from August to April.

Subspecies
Aethes dilucidana dilucidana
Aethes dilucidana eberti Sutter & Karisch, 2004 (Iran: Elburs Mountains)

References

dilucidana
Moths described in 1852
Moths of Asia
Moths of Africa
Moths of Europe
Taxa named by James Francis Stephens